Goshainganj is a constituency of the Uttar Pradesh Legislative Assembly covering the city of Goshainganj in the Faizabad district of Uttar Pradesh, India. Since 2008, this assembly constituency is numbered 276 amongst 403 constituencies.

Election results

2022

2022
The constituency was represented in the Legislative Assembly by Samajwadi Party member Abhay Singh, who won in the 2022 elections, defeating Bharatiya Janata Party candidate Aarti Tiwari by a margin of 13,079 votes.

References

External link
 

Assembly constituencies of Uttar Pradesh